Gender sensitivity is the process by which people are made aware of how gender plays a role in life through their treatment of others. Gender relations are present in all institutions and gender sensitivity especially manifests in recognizing privilege and discrimination around gender; women are generally seen as disadvantaged in society. Gender sensitivity trainings are used to educate people, usually employees, to become more aware of and sensitive to gender in their lives or workplaces. They are becoming more popular in the United States, particularly in areas of the service industry, such as healthcare and education.

Gender sensitivity in reproductive health 
Gender sensitivity in reproductive health is reliant on treating all clients with equal respect, regardless of sex, gender identity, marital status, sexual orientation, or age. Indicators of gender-sensitive service include: refraining from discriminating against or stereotyping clients on the basis of sex or gender, treating all clients with equal respect, offering gender sensitivity training to all employees, and providing adequate representation of female care providers. Gender-sensitive care also depends on informed consent to treatment for all clients. If service providers deliver gender-sensitive care, their clients might be more likely to seek further service from that provider.

Gender sensitization and children 
Gender sensitivity is enacted through a process known as gender sensitization. Gender sensitization promotes equality for men and women by allowing men and women to view what is stereotypical of and reasonable for their gender. Therefore, teachers are in a position to teach children about gender sensitization through how they conduct their classroom and interact with their students. Teachers who are successful at sensitizing their students to gender at a young age can influence a change in children's thought processes, which positions them to break societal stigmas in childhood and throughout life.

Teaching children to be sensitive to gender also relies heavily on the parents or guardians of the children. Children begin to develop their gender identity around two to three years old. At this age, gender identity is reinforced through messages from parents, whether gender sensitive or not. A common phrase that is not gender sensitive and might be heard by young children through their parents is “boys will be boys.” Other examples of non-gender-sensitive reinforcement of gender includes teaching children that pink is an objectively feminine color and blue is an objectively masculine color, as well as influencing young girls to play with dolls and boys to play with trucks. Educating children about gender identities that do not conform to the gender binary helps to break the stigma associated with these identities.

Global gender sensitivity 
Gender plays a large role in Indian thought processes. The separation of boy and girl indicators in India creates distance between men and women. Indicators of masculinity in boys include cars, the color blue, and superheroes; indicators of femininity in girls include dolls, the color pink, and princesses. 

Sweden is making a strong effort to become more gender sensitive. Sweden recently added the word “hen”—a gender-neutral pronoun—to their common language. This promotes a gender-neutral way of thinking for children.

See also
Gender equality

References 

Gender and society